Brian Murray (né Bell; 10 September 193720 August 2018) was a South African actor and theatre director who was inducted into the American Theater Hall of Fame in 2004.

Biography
Murray was born Brian Bell in Johannesburg, the son of Mary Dickson (née Murray) and Alfred Bell, a professional golfer.

Career
Murray made his Broadway debut in the play All in Good Time in 1965.  In 1967, he starred as Rosencrantz in the Broadway production of Rosencrantz and Guildenstern Are Dead, earning the first of three Tony Awards, Best Featured Actor In A Play nominations for his performance. 

Murray directed the 1973 Broadway revival of The Waltz of the Toreadors. His stage directing credits include Broadway revivals of Hay Fever (1985), Arsenic and Old Lace (1986), Blithe Spirit (1987), and The Show Off (1992). 

In 1998, he received the Lucille Lortel Award for outstanding body of work.

His film credits include Bob Roberts and City Hall. On television he has appeared in Kojak, Another World, Law & Order: Criminal Intent and 30 Rock. In the 1970s and 1980s, he performed in a number of radio plays for Yuri Rasovsky's award-winning National Radio Theater. In 2002, he provided the voice of John Silver in the Disney animated Treasure Planet, a role he reprised in the video game Treasure Planet: Battle at Procyon. He played a role in the 2009 film, My Dog Tulip.

Death
Murray died of natural causes on August 20, 2018.

Additional Broadway acting credits
Source: Playbill Vault
Sleuth (1973)
Da (1978)
The Arcata Promise (1982)
Noises Off (1983)
A Small Family Business (1992)
The Little Foxes (1997)
Twelfth Night (1998)
Uncle Vanya (2000)
The Crucible (2002)
The Rivals (2004)

Filmography
Source: Rotten Tomatoes

Source: Behind the voice actors

Film

Television

Videogames

Radio drama
A Tale of Two Cities (1977)
The Man of Destiny (1978)
The Killer (1979)
Medea (1985)
The Tempest (1985)
The Imaginary Invalid (1985)
The Lady of the Camellias (1985)
An Enemy of the People (1985)
Arms and the Man (1985)
Uncle Vanya (1985)

Awards and nominations
Sources: Playbill Vault; IBDB

Awards
 1984 Drama Desk Award for Outstanding Ensemble Work – Noises Off
 1997 Drama Desk Award for Outstanding Featured Actor in a Play – The Little Foxes

Nominations
  1968 Tony Award for Best Featured Actor in a Play – Rosencrantz and Guildenstern Are Dead
 1978 Drama Desk Award for Outstanding Actor in a Play – Da
 1992 Drama Desk Award for Outstanding Actor in a Play – A Small Family Business
 1997 Tony Award for Best Featured Actor in a Play – The Little Foxes
 2000 Drama Desk Award for Outstanding Featured Actor in a Play – Uncle Vanya
 2002 Drama Desk Award for Outstanding Featured Actor in a Play – The Crucible
 2002 Tony Award for Best Featured Actor in a Play – The Crucible
 2002 Annie Award for Voice Acting in a Feature Production – Treasure Planet

References

External links

1937 births
2018 deaths
20th-century South African male actors
21st-century South African male actors
Drama Desk Award winners
People from Johannesburg
South African expatriates in the United States
South African male film actors
South African male stage actors
South African theatre directors
White South African people